La Historia (Eng.: The History) is a compilation album released by regional Mexican band Intocable. This album became their second number-one set on the Billboard Top Latin Albums. It was released with two formats, CD and CD/DVD and both versions charted separately.

Track listing
Adapted from Billboard and AllMusic.

CD
Es Tan Bello (Miguel Mendoza) – 3:47
Enséñame a Olvidarte (Luis Padilla) – 3:24
Te Voy a Conquistar (Servando Cano) – 2:32
¿Y Todo Para Qué? (Pedro Reyna) – 3:11
Déjame Amarte (Eduardo Alanis) – 3:31
¿Dónde Estás? (Alanis) – 4:04
Por un Beso (Marco A. Pérez) – 3:30
No Te Vayas (Gilberto Abrego) – 3:27
Huracán (Pérez) – 2:56
Vivir Sin Ellas (Cano) – 3:04
Estás Que Te Pelas (Pérez/Cornelio Reyna Jr.) – 3:54
Contigo (A.B. Quintanilla/Luigi Giraldo) – 3:24
Eres Mi Droga (Mendoza) – 3:25
Ayúdame (Pérez) – 4:27
Un Desengaño (Cesar Alaffa) – 3:33
Amor Maldito (Mendoza) – 3:23
Coqueta (Padilla) – 3:01
¿Por Qué Tenías Que Ser Tú? (Miguel A. Estrada) – 2:56
Perdedor (Pérez) – 4:18
El Amigo Que Se Fue (Miguel Luna/Mendoza) – 3:39

DVD
Sueña (Padilla) – 4:16
El Poder de Tus Manos  (Padilla) – 3:06
Déjame Amarte  (Alanis) – 3:30
Enséñame a Olvidarte  (Padilla) – 3:22
Ya Estoy Cansado  (Padilla) – 2:38
El Amigo Que Se Fue  (Luna/Mendoza) – 3:47
Perdedor (Pérez) – 4:16
Amor Maldito (Mendoza) – 3:20
¿Dónde Estás? (Alanis) – 4:41
¿Y Todo Para Qué? (Reyna) – 3:14
No Te Vayas (Abrego) – 3:33
Coqueta (Padilla) – 3:00

Personnel
The information form Allmusic.
Nir Seroussi – Producer  
Miguel Trujillo – Executive producer  
Gregg Vickers – Concept  
Norma Vivanco – Graphic design
César Hernández – Photography 
José Quintero – Photography

Chart performance

CD/DVD edition

Standard edition

Sales and certifications

References

Intocable albums
2003 compilation albums
2003 video albums
Music video compilation albums